Weekend with Ramesh is an Indian talk show hosted by actor, film director and inspirational speaker Ramesh Aravind on Zee Kannada. The first season of the show began airing on 2 August 2014, and ended on 26 October 2014, after airing 26 episodes. The second season of the show aired from 26 December 2015 to 16 April 2016. The third season aired from 26 March 2017 and 2 July 2017. Pradyumna Narahalli was the script writer for season 2 and season 3.

Overview
The format of the show involves achievers on various fields, primarily from Karnataka, being invited and the story of their life being told. It involves appearances of various people associated with the "achiever" who narrate incidents from their association with the person. The show is being taped at Abbaiah Naidu Studio in the Chikkalasandra locality of Bangalore. The first season began airing on 2 August 2014, with actor Puneeth Rajkumar as the first invitee. Season 1 ended on 26 October, with the host Ramesh Aravind on the "achievers' seat", with film director and lyricist Yogaraj Bhat as the host.

The second season saw invitees mostly the giants of Sandalwood (cinema) like Vijay Prakash, Rajesh Krishnan, Ambareesh, Darshan, S. P. Balasubrahmanyam, Anant Nag, Raghu Dixit, Kiccha Sudeepa. Season 3 saw a mix of professions with achievers from entertainment industry like Arjun Janya, Gangavathi Pranesh, Bharathi Vishnuvardhan; poet, writer, lyricist Jayanth Kaikini; former judge of the Supreme Court Of India, former Solicitor General of India and Lokayukta for Karnataka State of India N. Santosh Hegde; Police officer Ravi D. Channannavar; business man Vijay Sankeshwar; litterateur, priest, writer Hiremagaluru Kannan and some politicians.

Currently airing Season 4 from the 20th of April 2019, inspiring people like philanthropist and the Dharmadhikari of the Dharmasthala Temple Veerendra Heggade, industrialist and co-founder of Infosys N. R. Narayana Murthy and an inspirational writer, speaker, philanthropist, chairperson of the Infosys Foundation Sudha Murthy directed by Anil Kumar J

List of episodes

Season 1

Season 2

Season 3

Season 4

References

External links
 
 

Indian television talk shows
2014 Indian television series debuts
Kannada-language television shows
Zee Kannada original programming